Tom Minton is an American animator, producer, writer, and storyboard artist. He created and wrote the "Toby Danger" episode of Freakazoid!, wrote the lyrics to the song "Brainstem" and served as head model for the Warner Bros. character the Brain in Pinky and the Brain. He was story editor of Ralph Bakshi's Mighty Mouse: The New Adventures, a 1987 series art-directed by John Kricfalusi.

He was the producer of Tom and Jerry: The Magic Ring (2001) and The Baby Looney Tunes' Eggs-Traordinary Adventure (2002). He was a writer/producer on Duck Dodgers (2003–2004) and a producer/story editor on Tom and Jerry Tales (2006) and a producer/story editor/writer of The Sylvester & Tweety Mysteries (1995–1999). He was a co-producer and so-writer of Tweety's High-Flying Adventure (2000). He is a multiple Emmy Award nominee for Disney's Raw Toonage, Tiny Toon Adventures, Animaniacs, The Sylvester & Tweety Mysteries, Duck Dodgers and Baby Looney Tunes. He is a Peabody Award winner as a writer on Animaniacs.
He has written several episodes for the hit Disney Channel animated series Phineas and Ferb.

The character of Brain was modelled after Tom Minton.

Notes

References
 Tom Minton at Keyframe – the Animation Resource
 
 

American film producers
American male screenwriters
1957 births
Living people
American storyboard artists
American television writers
Place of birth missing (living people)
American male television writers
American television producers
American television directors